Cardinal Newman High School, also commonly referred to as Cardinal Newman or Newman, is a private college preparatory Roman Catholic co-educational school in West Palm Beach, Florida, United States. It is located in the Roman Catholic Diocese of Palm Beach. Founded in September 1961, and named for the Cardinal John Henry Newman, it is one of two private Catholic high schools in Palm Beach County, Florida. In 2005, Cardinal Newman was the first Catholic high school in Florida, and one of only a dozen in the United States to offer the International Baccalaureate Diploma Programme.

History
Cardinal Newman High School traces its roots to St. Ann's Catholic School of St. Ann's Parish, located in downtown West Palm Beach. St. Ann's School opened its doors in 1925 to serve parishes in central Palm Beach County. This school would serve the educational needs of Catholic high school students until the early 1960s. This changed when Archbishop Coleman F. Carroll announced construction of a new high school in West Palm Beach.

In September 1961, a small number of Adrian Dominicans moved from St. Ann's School to the new single building Cardinal Newman High School. "A second classroom building was added within five years, and Archbishop Carroll dedicated a new cafeteria and gymnasium in 1973."

Over the years the school saw a number of additions and improvements, including the John P. Raich Athletic Building in 1985, Crusader Stadium in 1993, and the addition and updating of the lacrosse and softball fields in 2003. In 2006, a track and field facility was added, and the gymnasium was renovated. In 2010, the cafeteria underwent an extensive renovation, and the gym was further updated in the 2012-2013 school year. The school added a dance studio in 2012.

Academics
Cardinal Newman bases its academic program on local school policy, standards of the Florida Board of Education, and accreditation criteria issued by the Southern Association of Colleges and Schools. Students are required to take 14 semester credits each year during their four years in the following courses: Religion, English, Social Studies, a foreign language, Mathematics, Science, Physical Education, life management, and the arts. Students can also partake in the IB Diploma Program or Advanced Placement courses offered at Newman. Additionally, there is a community service component requiring students to complete a minimum of 25 hours per year serving their community during their time in high school.

Notable alumni

Jeff Atwater, former Florida Chief Financial Officer and former State Senator
 Laura Bennett, professional triathlete and 2008 and 2012 Olympic games participant
 Scottie Barnes, NBA small forward for the Toronto Raptors
 Jett Beres, musician and member of band Sister Hazel
 John Carney, professional football placekicker in the NFL
 Matt Cetlinski, Olympic gold medalist in swimming
 John Collins, professional basketball player for the Atlanta Hawks of the National Basketball Association (NBA)
 Marshall Criser III, President, Piedmont University
 Abram Elam, former American football safety in the NFL for the Cleveland Browns
 Craig Erickson, former University of Miami and NFL quarterback
 Mark Foley, a former Republican politician in the U.S. House
 Jacoby Ford, former American football wide receiver for the Oakland Raiders of the National Football League (NFL)
 Bradley Grace, musician and member of Post Hardcore band Poison The Well
 Chris T. Jones, former American football wide receiver in the NFL for the Philadelphia Eagles
 Brooks Koepka, professional golfer PGA Tour major championship winner and former World Number 1
 Theresa LePore, the former Supervisor of Elections for Palm Beach County, Florida, who designed the "butterfly ballot" used in the 2000 presidential election
 David Manning, professional baseball player
 Jackie Manuel, UNC basketball player
 Rev. Kevin F. O’Brien, S.J., Jesuit priest, educator, theologian and author; 29th President of Santa Clara University
 Travis Rudolph, NFL wide receiver
 Eddie Shannon, point guard for the Adelaide 36ers in the NBL

References

External links
 

Roman Catholic Diocese of Palm Beach
Catholic secondary schools in Florida
Preparatory schools in Florida
Buildings and structures in West Palm Beach, Florida
Private schools in Florida
Private high schools in Florida
High schools in Palm Beach County, Florida
Educational institutions established in 1961
1961 establishments in Florida
Private schools in the United States